The 2016–17 Sacramento State Hornets men's basketball team represented California State University, Sacramento during the 2016–17 NCAA Division I men's basketball season. The Hornets were led by ninth-year head coach Brian Katz and played their home games at the Hornets Nest as members of the Big Sky Conference. They finished the season 13–18, 9–9 in Big Sky play to finish in seventh place. As the No. 7 seed in the Big Sky tournament, they defeated Idaho State in the first round before losing to Eastern Washington in the quarterfinals.

Previous season
The Hornets finished the 2015–16  season 14–17, 6–12 in Big Sky play to finish in tenth place. They defeated Montana State in the first round of the Big Sky tournament to advance to the Quarterfinals where they lost to Montana.

Departures

2016 incoming recruits

Roster

Schedule and results

|-
!colspan=9 style=| Exhibition

|-
!colspan=9 style=| Non-conference regular season

|-
!colspan=9 style=| Big Sky regular season

|-
!colspan=9 style=|  Big Sky tournament

References

Sacramento State Hornets men's basketball seasons
Sacramento State